Jonathan Tennyson may refer to:
 Jonathan Tennyson (physicist) (born 1955), British physicist at University College London
 Jonathan Tennyson (car designer) (1945–1997), American solar powered car designer